Explorer S-45 was a NASA satellite, which was lost in a launch failure in February 1961. The satellite was intended to operate in a highly elliptical orbit, from which it was to have provided data on the shape of the ionosphere, and on the Earth's magnetic field. It was part of the Explorer program, and would have been designated Explorer 10 had it reached orbit. A second identical satellite, Explorer S-45A, also failed to achieve orbit when it was launched.

Launch 
Explorer S-45 was launched aboard a Juno II launch vehicle, serial number AM-19F. The launch took place from Launch Complex 26B at the Cape Canaveral Air Force Station (CCAFS) at 00:13:16 GMT on 25 February 1961. The launch vehicle malfunctioned after the second stage separated, and contact with the payload was lost. The third stages subsequently failed to ignite, resulting in the satellite failing to achieve orbit.

See also 

 Explorer S-45A
 Explorer program

References 

Spacecraft launched in 1961
Satellite launch failures
Explorers Program